Bodgaya Island is located off the east coast of Sabah, Malaysia. It is the largest island in and forms part of the Tun Sakaran Marine Park just off the town of Semporna. The island has an area of 7.96 km2. Bodgaya, together with Boheydulang Island and the surrounding reefs, are remnants of an extinct volcano.

See also
 List of islands of Malaysia
 List of volcanoes in Malaysia

References

Islands of Sabah
Volcanoes of Malaysia